In Search of Anna is a 1978 film directed by Esben Storm.

It was originally envisioned as a TV series but then became a feature.

Plot synopsis
Richard Moir plays Tony, who has just been released from jail. His former inmates want him to participate in a robbery, but Tony just wants to find Anna and ends up dealing with one problem at a time.

Cast
Richard Moir as Tony
Judy Morris as Sam
Chris Haywood as Jerry
Bill Hunter as Peter
Alex Taifer as Tony's father
Ian Nimmo as Buzz
Gary Waddell as Maxie
Richard Murphett as Undertaker

Production
It was Storm's second feature, following his debut with 27A and after an unsuccessful attempt to make another movie called Angel Gear.
I became aware that all the films being made in Australia were period films, Picnic at Hanging Rock, The Getting of Wisdom, Between Wars. I felt this reflected a society that was unable to come to terms with where it was at. I know you have to look into the past and find your heroes but it seemed to me that it was reflective of a desire not to face up to where we were at. That also coincided with where I was at personally in my relationship to women and to Haydn [former collaborator Haydn Keenan], so I thought I should make a film about leaving the past behind and coming to terms with the present, moving into the future with a positive attitude. That's what I thought I should do personally and that's what I felt Australia should do. It led to In Search of Anna.

The budget was meant to be $231,000 but went more than $100,000 over. $50,000 was provided by the Victorian Film Corporation. Shooting began on 28 February 1977.

Reception
According to Storm the film performed "really well, relatively" at the Australian box office, running for six weeks. It was also nominated for six AFI Awards.

Accolades

References

External links

In Search of Anna at Australian Screen Online
In Search of Anna at Oz Movies

Films directed by Esben Storm
1979 films
Australian drama films
1970s English-language films
1970s Australian films